The Kawasaki Ninja 125 (codenamed BX125) is a motorcycle in the Ninja sport bike series from the Japanese manufacturer Kawasaki that was introduced in 2018. It is powered by a  single-cylinder engine that produces a claimed .

It is the second Ninja sport bike to have a four-stroke single, after the Ninja 250SL.

Z125

The Kawasaki Z125 (codenamed BR125) is a Z series motorcycle introduced in 2018, and differing from the Ninja primarily in its trim. It is powered by a  single-cylinder engine that produces a claimed .

References

External links

Ninja 125
Sport bikes
Motorcycles introduced in 2018